Mossi may refer to:
Mossi people
Mossi language
Mossi Kingdoms
 the Mossi, a Burkinabe variant of the Dongola horse
Mossi (given name)
Mossi (surname)

See also
Mossie (disambiguation)
Mossy (disambiguation)
Mozzi (disambiguation)